Kozhay-Andreyevo is a rural locality (a selo) in Karatovsky Selsoviet, Tuymazinsky District, Bashkortostan, Russia. The population was 25 as of 2010. There are 2 streets.

Geography 
Kozhay-Andreyevo is located 50 km southwest of Tuymazy (the district's administrative centre) by road. Yakshayevo is the nearest rural locality.

References 

Rural localities in Tuymazinsky District